Minuscule 307 (in the Gregory-Aland numbering), Aπρ11 (Soden), is a Greek minuscule manuscript of the New Testament, on parchment. Palaeographically it has been assigned to the 10th century. 
It has marginalia. Aland's III Category.

Description 

The codex contains the text of the Acts of the Apostles and Catholic epistles on 254 parchment leaves. The text is written in one column per page. The biblical text is surrounded by a catena.

Text 

The Greek text of the codex Aland placed it in Category III.
Aland's Profile in Acts: 351 201/2 322 19S; in Cath: 621 81/2 172 15S.

In Acts 8:39 instead of πνεῦμα κυρίου (spirit of the Lord) it has unusual textual variant  (the Holy Spirit fell on the eunuch, and an angel of the Lord caught up Philip) supported by Codex Alexandrinus and several minuscule manuscripts: 94, 103, 322, 323, 385, 453, 467, 945, 1739, 1765, 1891, 2298, 36a, itp, vg, syrh.

In Acts 18:17 it reads παντες οι Ιουδαιοι for παντες; the reading is supported by minuscule 431.

In Acts 12:18 it reads μεγας for ουκ ολιγος, the reading is supported by 94, 431, 1175, 2818, copsa, arm.

History 

The manuscript was examined by Montfaucon, Wettstein, and Cramer. It was examined and described by Paulin Martin. C. R. Gregory saw the manuscript in 1885.

Formerly it was designated by 15a. In 1908 Gregory gave number 307 for it.

The manuscript is currently housed at the Bibliothèque nationale de France (Fonds Coislin, Gr. 25) at Paris.

See also 

 List of New Testament minuscules
 Biblical manuscript
 Textual criticism

References

Further reading 

 J. A. Cramer, Catenae, Oxford, vol 3 (1838), pp. IV-XI, 425–451.

External links 

 Minuscule 307 at the Encyclopedia of Textual Criticism

Greek New Testament minuscules
10th-century biblical manuscripts
Fonds Coislin